= Jenna's Law =

Texan law

Jenna's Law (Texas: Tex. Educ. Code § 38.0041; 2009 HB 1041; 2009 Tex. Gen. Laws, Chap. 1115) is a Texas law which mandates that all public schools, charter schools, and day care facilities train school aged children K-12, staff, and parents on the signs and symptoms of all forms of child abuse.

It is the first child sexual abuse prevention and education law named after a survivor that passed in the United States. The National Children's Alliance published an article about the history of Jenna's Law and its extension to address trafficking victims.

In Texas, training resulting from Jenna's Law has helped to increase reports of child sexual abuse.

Jenna Quinn, the survivor whom the law was named after, talked about her experiences in her 2017 TED talk.

Jenna's experiences are documented in her book, Pure In Heart: A Memoir of Overcoming Abuse and Passing Jenna’s Law.

== Background ==
Working with Quinn, Texas Representative Tan Parker introduced Jenna's Law as HB 1041 in 2009. Jenna's Law passed the State House unanimously on May 7, 2009 and became effective on June 19, 2009.

Later, Parker and Quinn worked to expand and strengthen Jenna's Law with the passage of HB 1114. This amendment to Jenna's Law passed unanimously on May 3, 2011 and mandates that research-based training is used to train students, all staff, and parents at all public schools, charter schools, day care centers, foster care centers, child placing agencies on all forms of abuse annually.
